Antonio Scaduto (born 1 December 1977) is an Italian sprint canoer who has competed since the early 2000s. Competing in two Summer Olympics, he won a bronze medal in the K-2 1000 m event at Beijing in 2008.

Scaduto also won a bronze medal in the K-4 500 m event at the 2005 ICF Canoe Sprint World Championships in Zagreb.

References

External links
 
 
 

1977 births
Canoeists at the 2000 Summer Olympics
Canoeists at the 2008 Summer Olympics
Italian male canoeists
Living people
Olympic canoeists of Italy
Olympic bronze medalists for Italy
Olympic medalists in canoeing
ICF Canoe Sprint World Championships medalists in kayak
Medalists at the 2008 Summer Olympics
Mediterranean Games bronze medalists for Italy
Competitors at the 2005 Mediterranean Games
Mediterranean Games medalists in canoeing
Canoeists of Fiamme Gialle
21st-century Italian people